Shah Zeyd (also Romanized as Shāh Zeyd and Shāhzāid; also known as Shāh Zeyd-e ‘Olyā) is a village in Chelav Rural District, in the Central District of Amol County, Mazandaran Province, Iran. At the 2006 census, its population was 209, in 59 families.

References 

Populated places in Amol County